Caribezomus is a monotypic genus of hubbardiid short-tailed whipscorpions, first described by Luis de Armas in 2011. Its single species, Caribezomus laurae is distributed in Jamaica.

References 

Schizomida genera
Monotypic arachnid genera